Audubon Sharon, which consists of the Sharon Audubon Center and the Emily Winthrop Miles Wildlife Sanctuary, is a wildlife sanctuary of the National Audubon Society in Sharon, Connecticut. Its facilities include a raptor aviary, an herb garden, a garden to attract bird and butterflies, a sugar house, a memorial room to Hal Borland, a small museum and store. Sharon Audubon Center is located at 325 Cornwall Bridge Road.

The residential facility within the wildlife sanctuary is used by interns and scientists who are conducting work in the area; none of the buildings are currently open to the public. Parking and access is available at 99 West Cornwall Road.

Audubon Sharon offers environmental education program for school groups. The Center also has summer and weekend environmental programs for adults and children.

Sharon Audubon Center 
Prior to the creation of Audubon Sharon, the land was owned by Clement and Keyo Ford who lived on a property known as Bog Meadow Farm. In 1961, the Fords donated the estate to the National Audubon Society to serve as an educational nature center for future generations.

The main building features the Hal Borland Room, a memorial to the nature writer whose work first appeared in The New York Times in 1941. Some of Borland's essays were collected and published as Sundial of the Seasons in 1964. The room includes photos, his books and typewriter.

Trails
The Sharon Audubon Center has a collection of trails available for visitors to walk, including the wheelchair accessible Lucy Harvey Multiple Use Interpretative area, totaling . Hal Borland is also honored with a  trail that begins near the "native wildflower garden and continues through brushland and deciduous forest to a streamside hemlock forest." The native wildflower garden includes Virginia bluebells, Aquilegia, and white violets. Another trail, the Fern Trail, is a narrow and rocky  woodland trail that follows the northern shore of Ford Pond. Over 70 species of birds have been recorded on the trail and there are many varieties of ferns to be seen. The Ford Trail is a  trail through the deciduous and hemlock forest. The Hazelnut Trail is a  loop trail. The Woodchuck Trail is a  trail through open fields and the deciduous forest. The Hendrickson Bog Meadow Trail is a  loop trail through the deciduous forest and along Bog Meadow Pond's shore.

Emily Winthrop Miles Wildlife Sanctuary
The Emily Winthrop Miles Wildlife Sanctuary was originally property owned by Emily Winthrop Miles, a poet, writer and artist, who acquired  of land in Sharon, Connecticut. In 1962, as part of her will, Miles donated the property to the National Audubon Society. The property now includes 1,500 acres of land that is situated amidst 5,000 acres of protected open space. The wildlife sanctuary includes forested land and two miles of Carse Brook Wetlands, home to endangered flora and fauna species.

See also 
 List of nature centers in Connecticut

References

External links
 Sharon Audubon Center

National Audubon Society
Nature centers in Connecticut
Protected areas of Litchfield County, Connecticut
Sharon, Connecticut